William Pettigrew Templeton (7 June 1913 – 23 October 1973) was a Scottish playwright and screenwriter who contributed a string of episodic dramas for American prime time television during the Golden Age of Television in the 1950s and 1960s.

Early life
At 20 Templeton wrote the one-act play The King's Spaniel, which ran at the Royal Lyceum Theatre, Edinburgh. In 1937, his first three-act play Circus Murder, was picked up and produced by Jevan Brandon Thomas at the Theatre Royal, Glasgow, then exported to London by the producer Esme Church for a run at the West End's Noël Coward Theatre (1938) under the title The Painted Smile. Theatre critic W.A. Darlington of The Daily Telegraph called it a "cleverly created illusion."  After being decommissioned from the RAF after World War II, Templeton wrote several West End plays in succession  including:
(1946) Exercise Bowler (Arts then transferred to the Scala Theatre) produced by Alec Clunes
(1948) The Ivory Tower (The Vaudeville Theatre) produced by Charles B. Cochran
(1950) You Won't Need the Halo (Arts Theatre) produced by Alec Clunes
(1954) Keep in a Cool Place (Saville Theatre) produced by Jevan Brandon Thomas
Sunday Times theatre critic James Agate wrote that Exercise Bowler "has an immense amount to say, is inventive, brilliantly theatrical and magnificently laid out for actors."  Templeton wrote the largely anti-war play under the pseudonym 'T. Atkinson,' a generic slang name for a British soldier at the time.

Hollywood career
In the late 1940s, Templeton started to move away from theatre and began writing for film and television. In 1948, he contributed dialogue to Graham Greene's script for The Fallen Idol directed by Carol Reed based on the short story by Greene. The film won the 1949 BAFTA award for best British film. In 1950, Templeton's screenplay adaptation of the book All On A Summer’s Day by HLV Fletcher became the British crime thriller Double Confession directed by Ken Annakin, starring Peter Lorre. In television, Templeton contributed to several prime time series of the period, including: The Alcoa Hour (1954–57); The Untouchables (1960); the original Adventures of Robin Hood  (1957) with Richard Greene; and the Westinghouse Desilu Playhouse  anthology series broadcast by CBS from 1948 to 1958 and produced by Desi Arnez.  In 1954, New York Times television critic Jack Gould wrote that Templeton's adaptation of George Orwell's dystopian novel, Nineteen Eighty-Four, "was a masterly adaptation that depicted with power and poignancy and terrifying beauty the end result of thought control."

Personal life
Templeton married the Hungarian actress Elizabeth Getrude Esterházy on 22 September 1953 in Westport, Connecticut. Samuel Goldwyn Jr. was his best man. They were divorced in 1961. They had one child, Christopher. On 23 October 1973, Templeton died of cirrhosis at the age of 60 in Glasgow.

Filmography

References 

1913 births
1973 deaths
Deaths from cirrhosis
Scottish dramatists and playwrights
Scottish film directors
Scottish screenwriters
Scottish television directors
Writers from Glasgow
20th-century British dramatists and playwrights
20th-century Scottish dramatists and playwrights
20th-century British screenwriters